Hector McNeil (10 March 1907 – 11 October 1955) was a Scottish Labour politician.

McNeil was educated at Woodside School and the University of Glasgow, trained as an engineer and worked as a journalist on a Scottish national newspaper. He was a member of Glasgow Town Council from 1932 to 1938. He chaired Glasgow Trades Council and stood for Parliament unsuccessfully in Galloway in 1929 and 1931, in Glasgow Kelvingrove in 1935 and in Ross and Cromarty in 1936. He was elected Member of Parliament for Greenock unopposed in a wartime by-election in 1941.

Following the 1945 election, McNeil became Parliamentary Under-Secretary of State for Foreign Affairs. He was promoted to Minister of State at the Foreign Office in October 1946, de facto deputy to the Foreign Secretary, Ernest Bevin, and appointed a member of the Privy Council. Through his position at the Foreign Office, he was vice-president of the United Nations General Assembly in 1947 and leader of the British delegation to the Economic Commission for Europe, 1948. It was later revealed that his personal assistant and private secretary at the time, Guy Burgess, was a Soviet agent, although McNeil never came under suspicion.

He served as Secretary of State for Scotland from February 1950 until October 1951 in the government of Clement Attlee. McNeil died shortly after keeping his seat in the 1955 election.

Hector McNeil Memorial Baths
The Hector McNeil Memorial Baths was a swimming pool in the town of Greenock named in honour of McNeil. The foundation stone was laid by McNeil's wife on 9 October 1963. The baths were demolished in 2002 after the Greenock Waterfront Leisure Centre opened.

Hector McNeil House
In May 2014 Inverclyde Council approved the name Hector McNeil House for the former library building in Clyde Square, Greenock when it re-opens as the main offices for Community Health and Care Partnership services in August 2014.

References

Sources
 Torrance, David, The Scottish Secretaries (Birlinn), 2006.

External links

 

1907 births
1955 deaths
Place of birth missing
Place of death missing
Alumni of the University of Glasgow
Scottish Labour MPs
Members of the Privy Council of the United Kingdom
British Secretaries of State
Secretaries of State for Scotland
People associated with Inverclyde
UK MPs 1935–1945
UK MPs 1945–1950
UK MPs 1950–1951
UK MPs 1951–1955
UK MPs 1955–1959
Ministers in the Attlee governments, 1945–1951